Shannon Rugby Football Club is the most successful club in the All Ireland League, having won the competition nine times. They hail from Limerick near the banks of the Shannon river. Shannon RFC is a member of the Irish Rugby Football Union Munster Branch. The club is one of the top amateur sides in Ireland has seen many of its players progress to professional and international rugby. The 1st XV plays in Division 1A of the All-Ireland League. While the women's side compete in Division 1 of the Munster League. Shannon RFC fields underage teams for boys and girls from u6s - u20s. Shannon RFC made history in 2017 as being the first club in the country to field a girls u20s side.

History
Shannon RFC was founded on 18 February 1884, in the Shamrock Bar on Corbally Road in Limerick. The founding members were Dan Duggan, Richie Gleeson, Pierce Hartney, Joe Hegarty and Paddy Lynch, who was the team's first captain. Stephan Hanrahan was president of the club for the first two years. Shannon remained a junior club for close to 70 years, during which time Shannon supplied numerous players to Garryowen. Shannon won the Munster Junior Cup for the first time in 1914. Their first Transfield cup was won in 1938. The following year, the Munster Junior Cup was won again. One year later (1940), in the process of winning their first Charity Cup, they added both the Munster Junior Cup and Transfield Cup.

Shannon attained senior status in the 1953–54 season, becoming Limerick's fifth senior club. In 1960 Shannon won their first Munster Senior Cup, defeating University College Cork, in a replay at Thomond Park, having drawn 8-8 the previous week at Musgrave Park, Cork.

Over the years, Shannon have had numerous temporary grounds, including the field at the Island Bank, Gilligan's field, Johnny Cusack's field and Egan's Field in Corbally. Those grounds were later sold to Corbally Utd. soccer club in favour of our current more spacious grounds at Coonagh off the Ennis Road. Today, Shannon's home grounds are Thomond Park.

While still a junior club, Shannon became co-tenants with Bohemians RFC at the Munster RFU-owned grounds at famed Thomond Park. In 1967, they completed their own Club Pavilion there. In 1978, the Pavilion was extended to the size it is today.

A milestone in the history of the club was the celebration of their centenary in 1984.

Honours
 AIB League
 1994–95, 1995–96, 1996–97, 1997–98, 2001–02, 2003–04, 2004–05, 2005–06, 2008-09: 9
Division 1B 2017–18, 2021–22
All-Ireland Cup
2007-08
Munster Senior Cup
1960, 1977, 1978, 1982, 1986, 1987, 1988, 1991, 1992, 1996, 1998, 1999–00, 2000–01, 2002, 2003, 2004, 2005, 2006, 2007-08: 19
Munster Junior Cup
1914, 1920, 1924–25, 1939–40, 1954, 1961–62, 1996, 2015: 8
Munster Senior League
1981, 1986, 1989, 2001–02, 2002–03, 2003–04, 2004-05: 7

Notable players
See also

Munster
Three Shannon players, Brendan Foley, Colm Tucker and Gerry McLoughlin, played for the Munster side that defeated the touring All Blacks 12–0 on 31 October 1978 at  Thomond Park. Mick Galwey captained the Munster side when they finished as runners up in the Heineken Cup finals of 2000 and 2002. In the 2005-06 season seven Shannon players, including the captain, Anthony Foley, helped Munster  win the Heineken Cup for the first time.

Ireland 7s
The following Shannon players have played for the Ireland national rugby sevens team:
 Greg O’Shea

Ireland
The following Shannon players have represented Ireland at full international level.

British & Irish Lions
The following Shannon players have also represented the British & Irish Lions.

International referee
 John Lacey
 Joy Neville

Potholes & Penguins Podcast

The origin of the term Pothole originates from the former Australia national rugby union teamplayer, John Langford (rugby union) , during one Shannon Rugby training session, he called one of his teammates a pothole. Source of this information is not verified but it was mentioned on the Penguins & Potholes Podcast (episode 2) hosted by Barry Murphy (rugby union) & Andrew Trimble , that David Quinlan (rugby union, born 26 January 1978) inquired what a pothole was when John Langford had said it. You will have to tune into the podcast to have a listen.

References

External links
 Shannon RFC's Official Website
 Shannon at Munster Rugby website
 Munster Rugby
 IRFU

 
Rugby clubs established in 1884
1884 establishments in Ireland
Irish rugby union teams
Rugby union clubs in County Limerick
Rugby union clubs in Limerick (city)
Senior Irish rugby clubs (Munster)